Kitty McKane defeated Helen Wills 4–6, 6–4, 6–4 in the final to win the ladies' singles tennis title at the 1924 Wimbledon Championships.

Suzanne Lenglen was the five-time defending champion, but withdrew from her semifinal match against Kitty McKane due to health problems.

Draw

Finals

Top half

Section 1

Section 2

Bottom half

Section 3

Section 4

References

External links

Women's Singles
Wimbledon Championship by year – Women's singles
Wimbledon Championships - singles
Wimbledon Championships - singles